"Mechocracy" is the fourth episode of Red Dwarf XII and the 71st in the series run. Originally broadcast on the British television channel Dave on 2 November 2017, it was made available early on 26 October 2017 on UKTV Play.

The machines aboard Red Dwarf grow concerned nobody has their interest in mind, and an election is held between Rimmer and Kryten to determine their new representative.

Synopsis
Red Dwarf goes into yellow alert, a personal favorite of Rimmer's, where the ship has to respond to an SOS call from another ship. Lister downloads the other ship's data; however, it turns out to really be an "SOS virus" and, due to Lister not downloading it onto a quarantined drive, it has infected the Red Dwarf computer system with harmful malware, forcing the crew to abandon the ship, which has started drifting towards a black hole. As the crew pack their supplies before escaping in Starbug, nearby vending machines question who'll be taking them to escape as well, before they list their importance. However, the crew explain they have no intention of bringing them along, so the machines combine their total power to defeat the malware infecting Red Dwarf.

Due to the machines feeling they have no one on ship with them in mind, they go on strike until the crew come up with a plan. Rimmer initially intends to appoint himself as their new leader, mainly for the power the position would bring, so Kryten decides to run against him in a democratic election held by the machines. Rimmer runs as a member of the "Lovely Fluffy Liberal Alliance Party" alongside Cat, who he's blackmailing with the information that he needs reading glasses, whilst Kryten runs as a member of the "Independent Future Party" with Lister, not wanting Rimmer to take control of the ship, as his voluntary running mate.

The election gets dirty as Rimmer decides to run a smear campaign on Kryten, airing attack ads on Kryten's mental health concerning his time taking care of the dead crew of the Nova 5. Kryten fires back, airing similar attack ads calling into account Rimmer having killed himself, twice. After some debates, the election is tied; to put the odds in their favour, Kryten and a begrudging Lister travel to the garbage hold where Talkie Toaster has been residing for the last 25 years. After agreeing to Talkie's demands to be put in the sleeping quarters and Lister eating a specified amount of toasted bread products each morning, they win his vote, which puts them over the edge, and Kryten wins the election for machine president. By next morning the crew are enjoying themselves, except for Rimmer, who Cat locked in the garbage hold alongside Talkie (who Lister has refused to take out of the garbage hold, despite getting his vote) until next week, as payback for blackmailing him to be his running mate. True to form, Talkie quickly drives Rimmer to insanity by constantly asking "Would you like some toast?"

Production
Even though Talkie's voice actor, David Ross, had since retired from acting, he still lent his voice to the character he last played in 1991, recording his lines at a sound studio in his native Lancashire. "Mechocracy" marks the fifth time Daniel Barker has voiced a distinct character in an episode, putting him at equal standing with Red Dwarf alumni, Tony Hawks.

Doug Naylor had initial concerns bringing back vending machine-centric plots after Series X, but ultimately decided in favour of it as it aided the overall plot and humour of the episode.

Reception
"Mechocracy" received positive reviews from critics and fans. Writing for Den of Geek, Mark Harrison referred to the episode as, "the first bonafide classic episode of the Dave era."

Sophie Davies of Cultbox praised the episode as a strong comeback from prior episode Timewave, "[It] could have easily been plucked from a much earlier series, ‘Mechocracy’ is the best episode of Red Dwarf XII so far and one of the best of the show’s Dave era."

References

External links

Series XII episode guide at www.reddwarf.co.uk

Red Dwarf XII episodes
2017 British television episodes
Television episodes about elections